Anton Maglica (born 11 November 1991) is a Croatian professional footballer who plays as a striker for Liga I club CFR Cluj.

Club career

Osijek
Born in Brčko, Maglica started his career playing at youth level for Orašje. After he moved to Osijek to attend high school, he immediately underwent trial at NK Osijek and joined their youth team. He made his debut for the first team in the last round of 2008–09 Prva HNL season against Slaven Belupo on 31 May 2009, when he replaced Josip Knežević for the final twenty minutes of the match. Next season he also got the chance as a substitute in the last round, this time in a home win against Cibalia. He scored his first goal in Prva HNL in a 1–0 victory over Cibalia at fog-covered Gradski vrt.

Hajduk Split
In the 2010–11 and 2011–12 seasons, Maglica made a name for himself as one of the best up and coming young Croatian attacking talents in the 1. HNL and was signed by league giants HNK Hajduk Split, rejected a larger offer from GNK Dinamo Zagreb in the process and immediately endearing himself to the club's loyal fans. He scored his first goal for his new club after coming on as a substitute against NK Zagreb. He scored the fifth goal of an emphatic 5–1 victory. His first season with the Bili gave a disappointing return of 5 goals in 17 appearances. The 13/14 season was far more successful for the striker as he scored 12 goals in 31 appearances.

He left Hajduk in January 2016 to join Cypriot side Apollon Limassol.

Apollon Limassol
Maglica signed for Apollon Limassol in a winter transfer window of the 2016–17 season.

Guizhou Hengfeng
Maglica signed for Chinese side Guizhou Hengfeng in a winter transfer window of the 2018–19 season.

Career statistics
Statistics accurate as of match played 2 March 2023.

Honours
NK Osijek
Croatian Cup runner-up: 2011–12
Hajduk Split
Croatian Cup: 2012–13
Apollon Limassol
Cypriot Cup: 2015–16, 2016-17
Cypriot Super Cup:  2016, 2017

References

External links
 

1991 births
Living people
People from Brčko District
Croats of Bosnia and Herzegovina
Bosnia and Herzegovina emigrants to Croatia
Naturalized citizens of Croatia
Association football forwards
Croatian footballers
Croatia youth international footballers
Croatia under-21 international footballers
NK Osijek players
HNK Hajduk Split players
Apollon Limassol FC players
Guizhou F.C. players
Kayserispor footballers
APOEL FC players
CFR Cluj players
Croatian Football League players
Cypriot First Division players
China League One players
Süper Lig players
Croatian expatriate footballers
Expatriate footballers in Cyprus
Croatian expatriate sportspeople in Cyprus
Expatriate footballers in China
Croatian expatriate sportspeople in China
Expatriate footballers in Turkey
Croatian expatriate sportspeople in Turkey
Expatriate footballers in Romania
Croatian expatriate sportspeople in Romania